Danville Township may refer to the following townships in the United States:

 Danville Township, Vermilion County, Illinois
 Danville Township, Des Moines County, Iowa
 Danville Township, Worth County, Iowa
 Danville Township, Blue Earth County, Minnesota